This is a list of notable Telugu people, also referred to as the Andhras in the Puranas. Telugu people are an ethnolinguistic group that speak Telugu, a Dravidian language in Southern India.

Ancient dynasties and kingdoms
 
 
 
 

Ancient dynasties
 Satavahana dynasty, also referred to as Andhras (2nd Century BCE – 3rd Century CE) 
 Andhra Ikshvaku (3rd Century CE – 4th Century CE) 
 Bruhatpalayana (270 CE – 285 CE)
 Salankayanas (300 CE – 440 CE) 
 Eastern Ganga dynasty (505 CE – 1434 CE))
 Vishnukundina Dynasty (420 CE – 624 CE) 
 Eastern Chalukyas (624 CE – 1189 CE)
Medieval dynasties
 Pericchedi Kingdom (626 CE – 1292 CE)
 Chalukyas of Vemulavada (7th Century CE – 10th Century CE) 
 Kakatiya dynasty (1163 CE – 1323 CE)
 Kota Dynasty (1100 CE – 1270 CE)
 Kondapadumati Dynasty (1114 CE – 1250 CE) 
 Chagi Dynasty (1100 CE – 1477 CE) 
 Reddy dynasty (1325 CE – 1448 CE)
 Gona Dynasty (13th Century CE)  
 Aravidu Dynasty (1336 CE – 1646 CE)
Telugu Chodas
 Renati Chodas (5th Century CE – 9th Century CE) 
 Velanati Chodas (1076 CE – 1216 CE) 
 Pottapi Chodas (11th Century CE) 
 Konidena Chodas (1050 CE – 1300 CE) 
 Nannuru Chodas (12th Century CE) 
 Nellore Chodas (11th Century CE – 12th Century CE)
Nayaks of South India
 Musunuri Nayakas (14th Century CE) 
 Recherla Nayakas (1368 CE – 1435 CE) 
 Pemmasani Nayaks (1423–1685)
 Sayapaneni Nayaks (16th Century CE) 
 Nayaks of Gingee (1509–1649)
 Madurai Nayak dynasty (1529–1736)
 Nayaks of Tanjore (1532–1673)
 Nayaks of Kalahasti (1542 CE – 1646 CE)
Foreign countries
 Nayaks of Kandy (1739–1815) ruled Sri Lanka.

Royalty

 Maharaja of Vizianagaram
 Bastar State
 Venkatagiri estate
 Thotapalle Estate
 Nuzvid Estate
 Pithapuram Estate
 Ettayapuram estate
 Bobbili Estate
 Rekapalle Estate
 Raja of Panagal
 Manyam Zamindar
 Gadwal Samsthanam
 Papannapet Samsthanam
 Wanaparthy Samsthanam

Historical warriors and rulers

 Gautamiputra Satakarni, He is the most powerful king of Satavahana Dynasty, 
 King Kandara 
 Madhava Varma II, He is the most powerful king of Vishnukundina Dynasty, He fought and won many more battles and he defeated Vakatakas King Prithivishena II. 
 Rajaraja Narendra, He is the most powerful king of Eastern Chalukyas, and patronage to Telugu language. 
 Ganapati Deva, He is the greatest king of Kakatiya Dynasty, He Unified Telugu Lands.
 Kulottunga I, He is the first Chalukya Cholas emperor, He Conqueror Kalinga, Sri Lanka, and Victory In Battle. 
 Gonka II, He was regarded as greatest among of all Chodas and also fought as general in earlier battles during his father reign.
 Gopana, Army commander of Vijayanagara Empire. 
 Madanna and Akkanna, Two Brothers and Historical Warriors. 
 Jayapa Nayudu, He defeated a Velanati Chodas, Jayapa participated in the Kakatiya conquest of Ganapatideva and was honoured with the title "Vairigodhuma Gharatta". 
 Gona Budda Reddy, He was a poet and ruler lived in Southern India.
 Prolaya Vema Reddy, First ruler of Reddi Kingdom, He was part of the confederation of states that started a Guerilla Tactics Movement  against the invading Turkic Muslim armies of the Delhi Sultanate. 
 Rama Raya, Vijayanagara Emperor, Founder of Aravidu Dynasty. 
 Venkatapati Raya, Aravidu dynasty. He dealt successfully with the Deccan Sultans of Bijapur and Golkonda, the internal disorders, promoting economic revival in the country.
 Timmarusu, was the Prime Minister of Krishna Deva Raya . He had also served as Prime Minister under Viranarasimha Raya and Tuluva Narasa Nayaka.  
 Kapaya Nayaka, Historical warrior and opposed muslim rule.
 Palanati Brahmanaidu, Historical warrior.
 Nagama Nayaka, He defeated Veerasekhara chola, and is the father of Viswanatha Nayak. 
 Viswanatha Nayak, Founder of Madurai Nayak Dynasty, He defeated Five Pandiyan kings. 
 Thirumala Nayaka, He is the most powerful king of Madurai Nayak Dynasty, war Against Bijapur Sultanate and Victory in the Battle. 
 Bangaru Thirumala Nayaka, He was a member of Madurai Nayak royal family and Military Commander of the Madurai Nayak King Vijaya Ranga Chokkanatha(1704–1731). 
 Sevappa Nayak, first ruler of Nayaks of Tanjore. 
 Raghunatha Nayak, He is the most powerful king of Nayaks of Tanjore. 
 Khem Nayak, He led a Rebellion as the Military Commander of Thanjavur Nayak against the Portuguese in their conquest of the Jaffna kingdom in 1619. 
 Pemmasani Ramalinga Nayudu, won the Battle of Raichur for Sri Krishna Devaraya. Commandar of Vijayanagara Empire Army.
 Malik Maqbul Tilangani, He was a Military Commander in the Kakatiya Dynasty.
 Shitab Khan, He joined as a foot soldier in the army of Humayun Shah, the Bahmani Sultan. 
 Damarla Chennappa Nayaka, Notable Ruler of Nayaks of Kalahasti. 
 Sri Vikrama Rajasinha, Last king of the Kingdom of Kandy
 Venkatarama Reddy, was the first Hindu kotwal of Kingdom of Hyderabad as in the late 19th and early 20th century, 
 Madurai Veeran, His name literally means "Warrior of Madurai", He is widely worshipped as a great hero of the people.
 Ondiveeran, was a commander-in-chief in Puli Thevar's army who fought against the British East Indian Company in Tamil Nadu.
Order of the Indian Empire
 Pusapati Ananda Gajapati Raju, Maharaja of Vizianagaram, He Awarded Order of the Indian Empire From United Kingdom. 
 Rajagopala Krishna Yachendra, Maharaja of Venkatagiri, He Awarded Order of the Indian Empire From United Kingdom. 
 Rao Venkata Kumara Mahipati Surya Rau,  Maharaja of Pithapuram, He Awarded Order of the Indian Empire From United Kingdom.
 Venkata Ranga Rao, Maharaja of Bobbili, He Awarded Order of the Indian Empire From United Kingdom.
 Panaganti Ramarayaningar,  He is Raja of Panagal, He Awarded Order of the Indian Empire From United Kingdom.
Women Rulers
 Rani Rudrama Devi, She is the most powerful queen of Kakatiya Dynasty. 
 Rani Mangammal, She is the most powerful queen of Madurai Nayak Dynasty. 
 Bhagmati was a mystic Hindu queen. 
 Govindamamba Pemmasani
 Nayakuralu Nagamma was a renowned statesperson and minister to King Nalagama, the ruler of Palanadu in Guntur District. In the epic war—Palnati Yudham (War of Palnadu).

Governors of States 
Bezawada Gopala Reddy – Governor of Uttar Pradesh
P. Chandra Reddy – Governor of Andhra Pradesh
 Bandaru Dattatreya – Current Governor of Haryana and Former Governor of Himachal Pradesh
 Kambhampati Hari Babu - Current Governor of Mizoram
 C. Vidyasagar Rao – Former Governor of Maharashtra and Governors of Tamil Nadu
V. V. Giri – Former Governor of Karnataka
Kasu Brahmananda Reddy – Governor of Maharashtra
 Konijeti Rosaiah – Former Governor of Tamil Nadu and Karnataka
B. Satya Narayan Reddy – Governor of Odisha
K. V. Raghunatha Reddy – Governor of Tripura
 Kona Prabhakara Rao – Former Governor of Maharashtra
 Pendekanti Venkatasubbaiah – Former Governor of Bihar
Marri Chenna Reddy – Former Governor of Tamil Nadu
 P. S. Ramamohan Rao – Former Governor of Tamil Nadu
 V. Rama Rao – Former Governor of Sikkim
 K. V. Krishna Rao – Former Governor of Jammu & Kashmir, Nagaland, Manipur and Tripura
V. S. Ramadevi – Former Governor of Himachal Pradesh and Karnataka

Speaker of the Lok Sabha 
Neelam Sanjiva Reddy Former Speaker of the Lok Sabha
G. M. C. Balayogi Former Speaker of the Lok Sabha

Chief Ministers 
N. T. Rama Rao – Former Chief Minister of   Andhra Pradesh
N. Chandrababu Naidu – Former Chief Minister of Andhra Pradesh
Y.S. Jaganmohan Reddy – Current Chief Minister of Andhra Pradesh
K. Chandrashekar Rao – Current Chief Minister of Telangana
Tanguturi Prakasam – Former Chief Minister of Madras Presidency and Former Chief Andhra State
Burgula Ramakrishna Rao – Former Chief Minister of Hyderabad State
A. Subbarayalu Reddiar – Former Chief Minister of Madras Presidency
Panaganti Ramarayaningar – Former Chief Minister of Madras Presidency
B. Munuswamy Naidu – Former Chief Minister of Madras Presidency
Ramakrishna Ranga Rao of Bobbili – Former Chief Minister of Madras Presidency
Kurma Venkata Reddy Naidu – Former Chief Minister of Madras Presidency
P. S. Kumaraswamy Raja – Former Chief Minister of Madras Presidency
Bezawada Gopala Reddy – Former Chief Minister of   Andhra Pradesh
Neelam Sanjiva Reddy – Former Chief Minister of   Andhra Pradesh
Damodaram Sanjivayya – Former Chief Minister of   Andhra Pradesh
Kasu Brahmananda Reddy – Former Chief Minister of   Andhra Pradesh
P. V. Narasimha Rao – Former Chief Minister of   Andhra Pradesh
Jalagam Vengala Rao – Former Chief Minister of   Andhra Pradesh
Marri Chenna Reddy – Former Chief Minister of   Andhra Pradesh
Tanguturi Anjaiah – Former Chief Minister of   Andhra Pradesh
Bhavanam Venkatarami Reddy – Former Chief Minister of   Andhra Pradesh
Kotla Vijaya Bhaskara Reddy – Former Chief Minister of   Andhra Pradesh
N. Janardhana Reddy – Former Chief Minister of   Andhra Pradesh
Y. S. Rajasekhara Reddy – Former Chief Minister of   Andhra Pradesh
K. Rosaiah – Former Chief Minister of   Andhra Pradesh
N. Kiran Kumar Reddy – Former Chief Minister of   Andhra Pradesh
K C Reddy – Former Chief Minister of Mysore state
V. Venkatasubha Reddiar – Former Chief Minister of Puducherry

Deputy Chief Ministers
Neelam Sanjeeva Reddy – Former Deputy Chief Minister of Andhra Pradesh
Damodar Raja Narasimha – Former Deputy Chief Minister of Andhra Pradesh
Koneru Ranga Rao – Former Deputy Chief Minister of Andhra Pradesh
J.V. Narsing Rao – Former Deputy Chief Minister of Andhra Pradesh
C. Jagannatha Rao – Former Deputy Chief Minister of Andhra Pradesh
Konda Venkata Ranga Reddy – Former Deputy Chief Minister of Andhra Pradesh
K. E. Krishnamurthy – Former Deputy Chief Minister of Andhra Pradesh
Nimmakayala Chinarajappa – Former Deputy Chief Minister of Andhra Pradesh
T. Rajaiah – Former Deputy Chief Minister of Telangana
Kadiyam Srihari – Former Deputy Chief Minister of Telangana

Presidents, Vice-Presidents & Prime Ministers
Presidents
Sarvepalli Radhakrishnan-Former President of India-and-Former Vice President of India
V.V. Giri – Former President of India and former Vice President of India
Neelam Sanjiva Reddy – Former President of India
Vice Presidents
Venkaiah Naidu – Former Vice President of India
Prime Ministers
 P. V. Narasimha Rao – Former Prime minister of India

Revolutionaries
 
 
 
 
 
 
 Alluri Sitarama Raju – freedom fighter & Revolutionary (Viplava Jyothi)
 Komaram Bheem – was an Indian tribal leader who fought against the Asaf Jahi Dynasty for the liberation of Hyderabad .He took up arms against Nizam's soldiers, who he fought until his last breath.
 Anabheri Prabhakar Rao – was a Telangana guerrilla leader and is also considered a foremost authority of the Telugu language. He was an Indian freedom fighter, considered to be one of the most influential revolutionaries of the Indian independence movement.
 Arutla Ramchandra Reddy – was an Indian freedom fighter. He was among the leaders and fighters in the armed freedom struggle against the rule of Nizam.
 Kaloji Narayana Rao – was an Indian poet, freedom fighter, anti-fascist and political activist of Telangana.
 Raavi Narayana Reddy – was a leader in the Telangana Rebellion against the rule of Osman Ali Khan , Asaf Jah VII.
 Baddam Yella Reddy – was an Indian Communist politician from Telangana. He was one of the prominent leaders in the Telangana armed struggle against the Nizam Regiment.
 Puchalapalli Sundarayya – was a founding member of the Communist Party of India (Marxist) and a leader of the peasant revolt in the former Hyderabad State of India, called the Telangana Rebellion. He is popularly known as Comrade PS.
 Bhimreddy Narasimha Reddy – was a freedom fighter and a leader of the Telangana Rebellion,  he was known, fought the Razakars during the Nizam's rule for six years by being underground.
 Nandyala Srinivasa Reddy – was a Member of Legislative Assembly, Andhra Pradesh and a leader of the Telangana Rebellion. He is popularly known as NSR.
 Burgula Ramakrishna Rao – was among the Telugu-speaking leaders to resist the Nizam in the princely state of Hyderabad.
 Chakali Ilamma – was an Indian revolutionary leader during the Telangana Rebellion.
 Konda Venkata Ranga Reddy – is a freedom fighter who fought the Telangana Rebellion against the Jagirdars.
 Chandra Rajeswara Rao – was an Indian freedom fighter from Andhra Pradesh. He was one of the leaders of the Telangana Rebellion (1946–1951). He also worked as Communist Party of India (CPI).

Militants and Rebels
 
 

 Nambala Keshava Rao, his nom de guerre “Basavraj”, He is a Leader and General Secretary of the Communist Party of India (Maoist), currently on National Investigation Agency Most Wanted.
 Muppala Lakshmana Rao, by his nom de guerre “Ganapathy”, He is a Commander-in-chief of the People's Liberation Guerrilla Army (India) is the Armed Wing of the Communist Party of India (Maoist). 
 Mallojula Koteswara Rao, commonly known by his nom de guerre “Kishenji”, was an Indian political terrorist who was a Politburo and Central Military Commission member of the Communist Party of India (Maoist). 
 Patel Sudhakar Reddy, was a leader of the central committee of the Communist Party of India (Maoist).
 Yalavarthi Naveen Babu, He was a Naxalite leader in India, He was founder of All India Revolutionary Students Federation. 
 Thippiri Tirupathi, is an Indian Maoist leader and Central Committee member of the Communist Party of India (Maoist). 
 Cherukuri Rajkumar, (alias Azad), was the spokesperson and one of the seniormost members of the Central Politburo of the banned Maoist group Communist Party of India (Maoist) . On 1 July 2010, he was killed by Andhra Pradesh Police in an encounter.
 Sadanala Ramakrishna, is an Indian Maoist politician, senior leader of Communist Party of India (Maoist) and head of the Central Technical Committee of the party.
 Ginugu Narsimha Reddy, is a Maoist politician and Central Committee member of the Communist Party of India (Maoist).
 Kondapalli Seetharamaiah, was a senior Communist leader and Maoist organizer in India.
 Mallujola Venugopal, is a Politburo and Central Military Commission member of the Communist Party of India (Maoist) , a banned Maoist insurgent communist party in India . 
 Katakam Sudarshan, commonly known by his nom de guerre,(Anand) is a Politburo member of the Communist Party of India (Maoist). 
 B. Sudhakar, is a Maoist leader and members of the Politburo of the Communist Party of India (Maoist). 
 Varkapur Chandramouli, was an Indian Maoist leader and Central Committee member of Communist Party of India (Maoist). 
 Varanasi Subramanyam, is an Indian Maoist and Central Committee member of Communist Party of India (Maoist). 
 Kadari Satyanarayan Reddy, known by his nom de guerre, “Kosa”, he is a banned Maoist Insurgent Communist Party of India, he was a Central Committee member of the Communist Party of India (Maoist)
 George Reddy, He was a university student, remembered now primarily for his promotion of Marxist ideas, Reddy was killed in an attack at his college campus on 14 April 1972.
 Varavara Rao, is an Indian activist, poet, teacher, and writer, He is an accused in the 2018 Bhima Koregaon violence and has been arrested under the Unlawful Activities (Prevention) Act. 
 Gummadi Vittal Rao, is a poet, revolutionary Telugu balladeer and local Naxalite activist from what is now the state of Telangana. 
 Gita Ramaswamy, is an Indian social activist and writer. 
 Belli Lalitha, founder of Telangana Kala Samithi who was murdered in 1999.
 Narmada Akka, was one of the "senior-most" female cadres of the Communist Party of India (Maoist). 
 Arunodaya Vimala, popularly known as vimalakka, Telugu balladeer and Social Activist.

Military Chiefs
Indian Army
 General K. V. Krishna Rao,  Chief of the Army Staff, 1981–1983
Indian Navy
 Admiral Ram Dass Katari, Chief of the Naval Staff, 1958–1962

Politicians
India
 P. V. Narasimha Rao – 9th Prime Minister Of India 
 N. T. Rama Rao, Founder of Telugu Desam Party.
 N. Chandrababu Naidu
 Y. S. Rajasekhar Reddy.
 K. Chandrashekar Rao, Founder of Telangana Rashtra Samithi 
 Pawan Kalyan, Founder of Jana Sena Party 
Vangaveeti Mohana Ranga (born 1947), MLA from Vijayawada East
 Y. S. Jagan Mohan Reddy, Founder of YSR Congress Party 
 Shabbir Ali, Minister during Indian National Congress rule in AP.
United States of America
 Aruna Miller – American politician and former members of the Maryland House of delegates representing District 15 in Montgomery County, Maryland
 Upendra Chivukula – Democratic politician who currently serves as a Commissioner on the New Jersey Board of Public Utilities after serving more than 12 years in the New Jersey General Assembly , where he had been the Deputy Speaker
 Suhail A. Khan – American conservative political activist
 Surya Yalamanchili – Democratic nominee who ran for Congress in Ohio's 2nd congressional district in 2010
 Vinai Thummalapally – U.S. Ambassador to Belize
South Africa
 Jay Naidoo – South Africa Independence Movement Activist 
 Ama Naidoo – South Africa Independence Movement Activist
 Kumi Naidoo – South Africa Independence Movement Activist
 Naransamy Roy Naidoo – South Africa Political Activist
 Shanti Naidoo – South Africa Politician and Anti – Apartheid Activist

Freedom fighters

 Alluri Sitarama Raju – freedom fighter and revolutionary (Viplava Jyothi)
 Gurajada Apparao
 Gurram Jashua
 Duggirala Gopalakrishnayya
 Vasireddy Venkatadri Nayudu – Zamindar of Amaravati (Guntur)
 N.G. Ranga
 P. Varadarajulu Naidu – was an Indian journalist and Indian independence activist. He was also the founder of The Indian Express
 Durgabai Deshmukh
 Uyyalawada Narasimha Reddy
 Kandukuri Veeresalingam – social reformer, writer, editor, performed first widow marriage in India
 Pingali Venkayya – freedom fighter and Indian National Flag designer
 Bhogaraju Pattabhi Sitaramayya – freedom fighter and founder of Andhra bank
 Pydimarri Venkata Subba Rao – writer of the National Pledge (India), written in Telugu first, later translated to other Indian languages
 Tanguturi Prakasam – was also known as Andhra Kesari (Lion of Andhra)
 Arutla Ramchandra Reddy – Indian freedom fighter & Telangana movement leader from Nalgonda
 Potu Narsimha Reddy – social reformer, Satyagraha Movement leader from Adilabad
 Vedre Ramachandra Reddy Bhoodhan – social reformer, Satyagraha Movement leader
 Potti Sreeramulu – responsible for the formation of linguistic states in India, died after fasting for statehood
 Vavilala Gopalakrishnayya – Gandhian and freedom fighter
 Nyapati Subba Rao Pantulu – one of the founder of The Hindu
 Sarojini Naidu
 Chowdary Satyanarayana – also known as Jananayak (People's leader) was an Indian freedom fighter, anti-colonial nationalist, human rights activist, legislator
 Komaram Bheem
 Gouthu Latchanna
 Kaneganti Hanumanthu
 Goparaju Ramachandra Rao
 Tripuraneni Ramaswamy Chowdary
 Tripuraneni Gopichand
 Cattamanchi Ramalinga Reddy (Sir C.R.Reddy)
 Kaloji Narayana Rao
 Anabheri Prabhakar Rao

Scientists
 Satya N. Atluri, renowned aerospace scientist, Padma Bhushan awardee in 2013 in science and engineering; recipient of the Global Aerospace Prize of $100,000, the Walter & Angelina Crichlow Trust Prize of AIAA; recipient, "Excellence in Aviation Award", from the United States Federal Aviation Administration
 G. D. Naidu, the "Edison of India"
 G. Satheesh Reddy, Chairman of India's Defence Research and Development Organisation (DRDO) and Secretary of the Department of Defence R&D.
 Yellapragada Subbarao (1895–1948), Indian biochemist who made many important discoveries while working in the United States
 P. Varadarajulu Naidu, Indian physician, politician, journalist and Indian independence activist.
 Raj Reddy, renowned computer scientist and former Dean of the Carnegie Mellon School of Computer Science. Currently, the only Turing Award winner from India.
 Suri Bhagavantam, famous Indian scientist and administrator who worked and collaborated with C.V.Raman He worked as Director of the Indian Institute of Science and the Defence Research and Development Organisation and as adviser to the Indian defense ministry.
 Yelavarthy Nayudamma
 M. Visvesvaraya, Indian engineer, scholar and statesman on whose memory Engineer's day is celebrated across India
 C. Radhakrishna Rao, famous for his works in Maths and Statistics. The Cramer Rao bound theory and the Rao-Blackwell theorem are among his best known discoveries

Economists and Policy makers
 M. Narasimham – Thirteenth Governor of RBI, Chaired Committee of Banking Sector reforms
 C. H. Hanumantha Rao – Member of the National Advisory Council from 2004 to 2008[2] and chaired the Technical Committee on Drought prone Areas Programme and Desert Development Programme of the Commission for Agricultural Costs and Prices.
 Y. Venugopal Reddy – Former Reserve Bank of India Governor from 6 September 2003 until 5 September 2008 - credited with imposing tough lending standards which shielded India from 2008 financial crisis
 Duvvuri Subbarao – Former Governor of Reserve Bank of India
M. Narasimham – Former Governor of Reserve Bank of India
 C. R. Krishnaswamy Rao – Former Cabinet Secretary
 V. K. R. V. Rao – Noted economist
 Narayana Kocherlakota – Former president of the Federal Reserve Bank of Minneapolis, Professor of Economics at the University of Rochester

Writers
 Paravastu Chinnayya Soori
 C. Narayana Reddy – Winner of Jnanapeeth award
 Tapi Dharma Rao Naidu – Writer
 Suravaram Pratap Reddy – Writer and historian from Telangana
 Kethu Viswanatha Reddy – Poet from Rayalaseema
 Kesava Reddy – Telugu novelist from Chittoor
 Ravuri Bharadhwaja – Winner of Jnanapeeth award Telugu novelist
 Malladi Venkata Krishna Murthy – Maximum number of stories written in Telugu – Over 3000
Pullella Sriramachandrudu – Sanskrit and Telugu scholar 
 Gidugu Venkata Ramamoorty – Writer
 Vegunta Mohan Prasad – Poet

Contribution to Telugu Language
Medieval Poets
 Nannaya Bhattaraka, also known as the First Poet "Aadi Kavi", the first poet of the Kavi Trayam, or "Trinity of Poets", that translated Mahabharatamu into Telugu over the course of a few centuries
 Tikkana also called "Tikkana Somayaji" (1205–1288), poet and member of Kavi Trayam
 Errana also known as "Yellapregada" or "Errapregada" ( 14th century).
 Gona Budda Reddy, 13th-century poet
 Annamacharya (1408–1503), mystic saint composer of the 15th century, widely regarded as the Telugu pada kavita pitaamaha (grand old man of simple poetry); husband of Tallapaka Tirumalamma
 Sri Krishnadevaraya, Vijayanagar Emperor, Telugu language patron, Telugu language poet
 Allasani Peddana, 15th century poet and known as foremost of Asthadiggajas (Eight elite Telugu poets under Sri Krishnadevaraya)
 Nandi Thimmana, a member of Ashtadiggajas
 Madayyagari Mallana, a member of Ashtadiggajas
 Dhurjati, a member of Ashtadiggajas
 Ayyalaraju Ramambhadrudu, a member of Ashtadiggajas
 Pingali Surana, a member of Ashtadiggajas
 Ramarajabhushanudu, a member of Ashtadiggajas
 Tenali Ramakrishna, poet, scholar, thinker and a special advisor in the court of Krishnadevaraya, nicknamed Vikatakavi
 Molla, also known as "Mollamamba", both popular names of Atukuri Molla (1440–1530), poet who wrote Telugu Ramayan; a woman
 Potana, born Bammera Pothana (1450–1510), poet best known for his translation of the Bhagavata Purana from Sanskrit; the book is popularly known as Pothana Bhagavatham
 Tallapaka Tirumalamma, also known as "Timmakka" and "Thimmakka" ( 15th century), poet who wrote Subhadra Kalyanam; wife of singer-poet Annamacharya and was popularly known as Timmakka
 Vemana ( 14th century), poet
 Bhadrachala Ramadasu, 17th-century Indian devotee of Lord Rama and a composer of Carnatic music
Renaissance Poets
 Kandukuri Veeresalingam (1848–1919), social reformer, poet, scholar, founded the journal Vivekavardhani, introduced the essay, biography, autobiography and the novel into Telugu literature
 Gurajada Apparao (1862–1915), poet, writer and playwright who wrote the first Telugu play, Kanyasulkam; also an influential social reformer sometimes called Mahakavi ("the great poet")
 Gurram Jashuva (1895–1971), a dalit poet and writer and producer of All India Radio, awarded "Padma Bhushan" by the Govt of India, known for poetry on social evils
 Srirangam Srinivasa Rao (1910–1983), marxist poet notable for his work Maha Prasthanam
 Jwalamukhi, pen name of Veeravalli Raghavacharyulu (1938–2008), poet, novelist, writer and political activist
 Viswanatha Satyanarayana (1895–1976), popularly known as the Kavi Samraat ("Emperor of Poetry")
 Balijepalli Lakshmikantham (1881–1953), poet and dramatist
 Chellapilla Venkata Sastry, poet and scholar
 Devulapalli Krishna Sastry (1887–1981), poet and writer of radio plays, known as "Andhra Shelly"
 Devarakonda Balagangadhara Tilak 
 Divakarla Tirupati Sastry 
 Rayaprolu Subba Rao 
 C. R. Reddy
Modern Poets
 C. Narayana Reddy (born 1931), poet, academic and songwriter
 Aarudhra (1925–1998), author, poet, essayist, writer of stories (including detective stories), playwright, translator, composer of film songs
 Mohammad Ismail (born 1928–2003), Telugu-language poet, critic, academic and university administrator.
 Suravaram Pratap Reddy, writer and historian from Telangana
 Kethu Viswanatha Reddy, poet from Rayalaseema
 Gunturu Seshendra Sarma (1927–2007), also known as Yuga Kavi
 Papineni Sivasankar, poet and critic from Andhra Pradesh 
 Sirivennela Sitaramasastri, popular poet and lyricist

Religious Leaders and Philosophers
 Vallabhacharya – one of the prominent Bhakthi movement leaders
 Acharya Nagarjuna – Buddhist philosopher and alchemist
 Yogi Vemana – poet and philosopher
 Pothuluri Veerabrahmam – well-known saint and astrologer in the 17th century
 U. G. Krishnamurti – world-famous 20th century philosopher
 Jiddu Krishnamurti – 20th century spiritual teacher and philosopher
 Sringeri Shankaracharya
 Nimbarka – one of the four principal Vaishnav acharyas of India
 Vishnuswami – one of the four principal Vaishnav acharyas of India
 Vallabha – another major Vaishnav acharya
 Satya Sai Baba – internationally renowned Spiritual Master, based in Puttaparti
 Sadasiva Brahmendra – Bhakthi Poet
 Bhakta Potana – realised Soul and a Bhakthi poet who translated Bhagavatam to Telugu
 Kancherla Gopanna – also popularly known as Ramadasu
 Annamacharya – great devotee of Tirumala Lord Venkateswara who has written 40,000 songs and composed them
 Tyagaraja – great devotee of Lord SriRama who is excelled in carnatic music and have written and composed some 30,000 songs majorly on Sri Rama. He is born of a Telugu family, and brought up in present Tamil Nadu.
 Syama Sastri – oldest among the Trinity of Carnatic music, Tyagaraja and Muthuswami Dikshitar being the other two. All his compositions are in Telugu. He is born of a Telugu family, and brought up in present Tamil Nadu.
 Sadhguru – mystic and yogi. Founder of Isha Yoga, a non profit organization. Born in Mysore to a Telugu-speaking family .

Academics
 Cattamanchi Ramalinga Reddy – First Vice-Chancellor of Andhra University
 Sarvepalli Radhakrishnan – Second President of Republic of India, and noted Philosopher
 G. Ram Reddy – Former University Grants Commission chairman
 Sarvepalli Gopal – Indian historian
 Veluri Venkata Krishna Sastry – Archaeologist
 J. N. Reddy – Oscar S. Wyatt Endowed Chair in Mechanical Engineering at Texas A&M University
 Arjula Ramachandra Reddy – biologist, First vice-chancellor of Yogi Vemana University
 Pavani Parameswara Rao – a Senior Advocate in the Supreme Court of India

Award winners

Olympic Medalists 

 Karnam Malleswari – Bronze medal for Weightlifting, first Indian woman to win a medal at the Olympics.
 P. V. Sindhu – Silver medal in 2016 and Bronze medal in 2020 for Badminton, the first Indian to become the Badminton World Champion and the only badminton player from India to win two consecutive medals at the Olympic Games.

Commonwealth Games medallists 

 Pullela Gopichand – Badminton
 P. V. Sindhu – Badminton
 Jwala Gutta – Badminton
 Parupalli Kashyap – Badminton
 Srikanth Kidambi – Badminton
 Satwiksairaj Rankireddy – Badminton
 N. Sikki Reddy – Badminton
 Gadde Ruthvika Shivani – Badminton
 Chetan Anand (badminton) – Badminton
 Deepthi Chapala – Badminton
 Gurusai Dutt – Badminton
 Ragala Venkat Rahul – Olympic weightlifting
 Shailaja Pujari – Olympic weightlifting
 Neelam Setti Laxmi – Olympic weightlifting
 Santoshi Matsa – Olympic weightlifting
 Badathala Adisekhar – Olympic weightlifting
 Valluri Srinivasa Rao – Olympic weightlifting
 Sharath Kamal – Table tennis
 Jignas Chittibomma – Archery
 Mohammad Hussamuddin – Amateur boxing
 Mahesh Bhupathi – Tennis
 Rushmi Chakravarthi – Tennis

Bharat Ratna

 Sarvepalli Radhakrishnan, awarded 1954
 Mokshagundam Vishweshvaraiah, awarded 1955
 V. V. Giri, awarded 1975

Padma Vibhushan

 N. G. Ranga
 P. V. R. Rao
 Padmaja Naidu
 Palle Rama Rao
 Prathap C. Reddy
 Ramoji Rao
 Ravi Narayan Reddy
 Roddam Narasimha
 S. P. Balasubrahmanyam
 Sadhguru
 Akkineni Nageswara Rao
 C. R. Rao 
 Cingireddy Narayana Reddy
 K. Satchidananda Murty
 Kaloji Narayana Rao (1992)
 Kotha Satchidananda Murthy
 M. Balamuralikrishna
 M. N. Venkatachaliah
 M. Narasimham
 Sarvepalli Gopal
 Durgabai Deshmukh
 V. Ramalingaswami
 Y. V. Reddy
 Y. Venugopal Reddy (2010)
 Yamini Krishnamurthy

Padmabhushan

 Satya Nadella
 Nookala Chinna Satyanarayana
 Satya N. Atluri
 C. K. Nayudu
 C. Narayana Reddy
 P. Bhanumathi
 Pullela Gopichand
 P. V. Sindhu
 Maharajkumar of Vizianagram
 Chiranjeevi
 Krishna Ella
 A. V. Rama Rao
 D. Nageshwar Reddy
 S. P. Balasubrahmanyam
 P. Susheela
 Krishna (Telugu actor)
 G. V. Krishna Reddy
 Kallam Anji Reddy
 P. Chandrasekhara Rao
 D. Ramanaidu
 Anumolu Ramakrishna
 Yarlagadda Lakshmi Prasad
 Boyi Bhimanna
 Yamini Krishnamurthy
 B. V. Raju
 Palle Rama Rao
 Akkineni Nageswara Rao
 C. H. Hanumantha Rao
 K. I. Varaprasad Reddy
 Narasimhiah Seshagiri
  Adusumalli Radha Krishna
 S. S. Badrinath
 Prathap C. Reddy
 Vavilala Gopalakrishnayya
 Jaggayya
 Gottipati Brahmaiah
 K. Satchidananda Murty
 Sripada Pinakapani
 Vuppuluri Ganapathi Sastry
 Pratury Trirumala Rao
  	M. R. Brahmam
  	Gainedi A. Narasimha Rao
 Gurram Jashuva
 Viswanatha Satyanarayana
 A. S. Rao
 Syed Husain Zaheer
 Vennelakanti Raghavaiah
 B. N. Reddy
 Devulapalli Krishnasastri
 Perugu Siva Reddy
 Mahankali Seetharama Rao
 Cheruvari Lakshmanan
 Manikonda Chalapathi Rau
 Mamidipudi Venkatarangayya
 Madapati Hanumantha Rao
 Andal Venkatasubba Rao
 K. A. Nilakanta Sastri
  Pandyala Satyanarayana Rau

Padmasri 

 A. S. Rao
 A. V. Rama Rao
 Akkineni Nageswara Rao
 Allu Ramalingaiah
 Annavarapu Rama Swamy
 Asavadi Prakasarao
 Atluri Sriman Narayana
 AVS Raju
 A. G. K. Gokhale
 A. Kanyakumari
 B. L. Deekshatulu
 B. Ramana Rao
 B. V. Raju
 B. V. Rao
 Bapu (director)
 Bhupathiraju Somaraju
 Boyi Bhimanna
 Brahmanandam
 C. Narayana Reddy
 C. Venkata S. Ram
 Challagalla Narasimham
 Chintakindi Mallesham
 Chintala Venkat Reddy
 Chittoor Mohammed Habeebullah
 D. Nageshwar Reddy
 D. V. S. Raju
 Dalavai Chalapathi Rao
 Daripalli Ramaiah
 Darshanam Mogilaiah
 Dasari Prasada Rao
 Dasika Durga Prasada Rao
 Dattatreyudu Nori
 Dwaram Venkataswamy Naidu
 G. Muniratnam
 Gajam Anjaiah
 Gajam Govardhana
 Garikapati Narasimha Rao
 Ghantasala
 Gnanananda Kavi
 Gopi Chand Mannam
 Goriparthi Narasimha Raju Yadav
 Gosaveedu Shaik Hassan
 Govindan Sundararajan
 Guduru Venkatachalam
 Gullapalli Nageswara Rao
 Gummadi
 Harika Dronavalli
 I. V. Subba Rao
 Immaneni Sathyamurthy
 Iyyanki Venkata Ramanayya
 Jalakantapuram Ramaswamy Krishnamoorthy
 Jonnalagadda Gurappa Chetty
 K. Paddayya
 K. S. Chandrasekharan
 K. Viswanath
 Kadiyala Ramachandra
 Kailasam Raghavendra Rao
 Kakarla Subba Rao
 Kallam Anji Reddy
 Kallur Subba Rao
 Kalyanam Raghuramaiah
 Kanaka Raju
 Karnam Malleswari
 Katuru Narayana
 Kolakaluri Enoch
 Koneru Humpy
 Koneru Ramakrishna Rao
 Kota Srinivasa Rao
 Krishna Reddy
 Krishnaswami Ramiah
 Kutikuppala Surya Rao
 Lavu Narendranath
 Laxma Goud
 Mahesh Bhupathi
 M. Balamuralikrishna
 M. V. Rao
 M. Y. S. Prasad
 Machani Somappa
 Manjula Anagani
 Mohan Babu
 Moturi Satyanarayana
 Mudundi Ramakrishna Raju
 Mukesh Kumar 
 Myneni Hariprasada Rao
 N. G. Krishna Murti
 N. T. Rama Rao
 Narain Karthikeyan
 Narla Tata Rao
 Nataraja Ramakrishna
 Nerella Venu Madhav
 Nidumolu Sumathi
 Nuthakki Bhanu Prasad
 P. Bhanumathi
 P. V. Sindhu
 Palle Rama Rao
 Pannuru Sripathy
 Perugu Siva Reddy
 Prem Watsa
 Pullela Gopichand
 Pullella Sriramachandrudu
 Puttaparthi Narayanacharyulu
 Raghu Ram Pillarisetti
 Raja and Radha Reddy
 Ravi Kumar Narra
 Rekandar Nageswara Rao
 Relangi
 S. M. Arif
 S. M. Ganapathy
 S. S. Badrinath
 S. S. Rajamouli
 Saibaba Goud
 Sakini Ramachandraih
 Shantha Sinha
 Sharath Kamal
 Sheik Chinna Moulana
 Shobha Naidu
 Shobha Raju
 Siramdasu Venkata Rama Rao
 Sirivennela Seetharama Sastry
 Sitaram Rao Valluri
 Sowcar Janaki
 Sribhashyam Vijayasarathi
 Srikanth Kidambi
 Srirangam Gopalaratnam
 Sthanam Narasimha Rao
 Sunkara Venkata Adinarayana Rao
 T. Venkatapathi Reddiar
 Tabu
 Turlapaty Kutumba Rao
 U. Srinivas
 V. Nagayya
 V. Narayana Rao
 V. Satyanarayana Sarma
 Vamsi Mootha
 Venkateswara Rao Yadlapalli
 Vijay Raghav Rao
 Vijayalakshmi Ravindranath
 Vinjamuri Venkata Lakshmi Narasimha Rao
 Vulimiri Ramalingaswami
 VVS Laxman
 Yarlagadda Lakshmi Prasad
 Yarlagadda Nayudamma
 Yella Venkateswara Rao
 Addepalli Sarvi Chetty – social work
 Aekka Yadagiri Rao – Arts
 Anumolu Sriramarao – social work
 Chandrakant Pithawa – Science & Engineering
 Devan Venkata Reddy – trade & industry
 Devarapalli Prakash Rao – social work
 Gadde Ramakoteswar Rao – Science & Engineering
 Hari Narain – civil service
 Jayakumari Chikkala – Medicine
 Kalluri Gopal Rao – Civil Service
 Argula Nagaraja Rao – trade & industry
 Mohan Reddy Venkatrama Bodanapu – trade & industry
 N. Balakrishna Reddy – social work
 Nampally Divakar – Science & Engineering
 Padamanur Ananda Rau – trade & industry
 Padmaja Reddy – Arts
 Sheik Nazar – Arts
 Sistha Venkata Seetharama Shastry – Science & Engineering
 Sudha Venkatasiva Reddy – social work
 T. V. Narayana – social work
 Tadepalli Venkanna – Arts
 Tripuraneni Hanuman Chowdary – Civil Service
 V. Koteswaramma – Literature & Education
 V. Ramchandra Vajramushti – Civil Service
 Vadalmudi Venkata Rao – Literature & Education
 Yadla Gopalarao – Arts

Sahitya Akademi Award

Bala Sahitya Puraskar winners

Khel Ratna Award
The Khel Ratna Award is India's highest sporting honor.
 Karnam Malleswari – For Weightlifting
 Pullela Gopichand – For Badminton
 P. V. Sindhu – For Badminton
 Rohit Sharma – For Cricket

Jnanpeeth Award
 Viswanatha Satyanarayana for his work Ramayana Kalpavrukshamu for the year 1970.
 C. Narayanareddy for his Telugu poetic work Viswambara for the year 1988.
 Ravuri Bharadhwaja for his Telugu poetic work Pakudu Rallu (Crawling Stones) for the year 2012.

Sahitya Akademi Award
 Viswanadha Satyanarayana for his poetry book Viswanadha Madhyakaralu
 Balantrapu Rajanikanta Rao for Andhra Vaggeyakara Charitramu
 Suravaram Pratap Reddy for his social history book Andhrula Sanghika Charitamu (1955)
 Kethu Viswanatha Reddy for his short stories book Kethu Viswanatha Reddy Kathalu

Dada Saheb Phalke award
 Bomireddi Narasimha Reddy (1974)
 Paidi Jairaj (1980)
 L. V. Prasad (1982)
 B. Nagi Reddy (1986)
 Akkineni Nageswara Rao (1990)
 D. Ramanaidu (2009)
 K. Viswanath (2016)

Dronacharya Award 
 A. Ramana Rao – Volleyball (1990)
 Shyam Sunder Rao – Volleyball (1995)
 S. M. Arif – Badminton (2000)
  E. Prasad Rao – Kabaddi (2002)
  Koneru Ashok – Chess (2006)
 Pullela Gopichand – Badminton (2009)
  Nagapuri Ramesh – Athletics (2016)
  G. S. S. V. Prasad – Badminton (2017)
  Achanta Srinivasa Rao – Table Tennis (2018)

Arjuna Award 

 V. V. S. Laxman – Cricket
 Rohit Sharma – Cricket
 Mukesh Kumar – Hockey
 PV Sindhu – Badminton
 Pullela Gopichand – Badminton
 Parupalli Kashyap – Badminton
 Chetan Anand – Badminton
 B. Sai Praneeth – Badminton
 Jwala Gutta – Badminton
 Srikanth Kidambi – Badminton
 Satwiksairaj Rankireddy – Badminton
 Sharath Kamal – Table Tennis
 Mahesh Bhupathi – Tennis
 Saketh Myneni – Tennis
 Koneru Humpy – Chess
 Pentala Harikrishna – Chess
 Harika Dronavalli – Chess
 Sharath Kamal – Table tennis
 Tulsidas Balaram – Football
 Karnam Malleswari – Weight lifting
 Kamineni Eswara Rao – Weight lifting
 P. V. Ramana – Volleyball
 Shyam Sunder Rao – Volleyball
 A. Ramana Rao – Volleyball

Ramon Magsaysay Award 
The Ramon Magsaysay Award was established in 1957 in memory of Ramon Magsaysay, the late president of the Philippines. It is often considered to be Asia's Nobel Prize.
 Palagummi Sainath
 Shantha Sinha
 Bezwada Wilson

Guinness World Records 
 S. P. Balasubrahmanyam – holds the Guinness World Record for having sung the most songs for any male playback singer in the world, with the majority of his songs sung in Telugu.
 P. Susheela – She entered the Guinness Book of World Records for recording the highest number of songs in musical history.
 Dasari Narayana Rao – holds the Guinness World Record as the most films directed with 151 films.
 D. Ramanaidu – holds the Guinness World Record as the most prolific producer with 130 films.
 Ramoji Film City – Guinness Record had been awarded to Ramoji Film City, Hyderabad as the largest film studio complex in the world, it opened in 1996 and measures 674 hectares (1,666 acres). With 47 sound stages, it has permanent sets ranging from railway stations to temples.
 Brahmanandam – M.R Brahmanandam holds the Guinness World Record for acting in the most films in a single language, 1000+ films.
 Vijaya Nirmala – in 2002, the Guinness Book of Records named Vijaya Nirmala as the female director with the most films, having made 47 films. In a career spanning approximately two decades, she has acted in over 200 films with 25 each in Malayalam and Tamil and produced 15 films.

Sangeet Natak Akademi Fellowship 
 V. Satyanarayana Sarma
 Nataraja Ramakrishna
 Vempati Chinna Satyam
 Rallapalli Ananta Krishna Sharma
 V. Satyanarayana Sarma
 M. Balamuralikrishna
 Yamini Krishnamurthy

Sangeet Natak Akademi Award 

 Sthanam Narasimha Rao
 Banda Kanakalingeshwara Rao
 Kalyanam Raghuramaiah
 Peesapati Narasimha Murty
 M. Balamuralikrishna
 Nookala Chinna Satyanarayana 
 Annavarapu Rama Swamy
 Chitti Babu
 Deerghasi Vizai Bhaskar
 Nidumolu Sumathi
 Yella Venkateswara Rao
 Dwaram Venkataswamy Naidu
 Kolanka Venkata Raju
 U. Srinivas
 Budaloor Krishnamurthy Shastri
 Prapancham Sitaram
 Puranam Purushottama Sastri
 Nedunuri Krishnamurthy
 Sripada Pinakapani
 Emani Sankara Sastry
 Sheik Chinna Moulana
 Domada Chittabbayi
 E. Gayathri
 Srimushnam V. Raja Rao
 A. Kanyakumari
 Dwaram Durga Prasad Rao
 V. Satyanarayana Sarma
 Ananta Charan Sai Babu
 Yamini Krishnamurthy
 Vempati Chinna Satyam
 Nataraja Ramakrishna
 Shobha Naidu
 Veernala Jayarama Rao
 Uma Rama Rao

International Positions
United States
 Ajay Naidu – Hollywood actor 
 Arvind Krishna – Indian-American business executive. He is the chief executive officer (CEO) of IBM
 Saagar Enjeti – independent political news commentator, based in Washington D.C.
 Adivi Sesh – Hollywood actor, director, writer 
 Varun Sandesh – actor 
 Surya Yalamanchili – Democratic nominee who ran for Congress in Ohio's 2nd congressional district in 2010
 Vinai Thummalapally – U.S. Ambassador to Belize 
 Kris Kolluri – New Jersey Commissioner of Transportation 
 C. R. Rao – mathematician, statistician
 Rao Remala – first Indian Employee at Microsoft 
 Satya Nadella – CEO of Microsoft 
 Shantanu Narayen – CEO of Adobe Systems
 Raj Reddy – recipient of Turing Award
 Padmasree Warrior – former chief executive officer of Nio Inc. 
 Vijaya Lakshmi Emani (1958–2009) – social activist, posthumously awarded Presidential Citizens Medal 
 Sarayu Rao – Hollywood Actress 
 Aneesh Chaganty – Hollywood director 
 Akash Vukoti – TV personality 
 Narayana Kocherlakota – American economist and is the Lionel W. McKenzie Professor of Economics at the University of Rochester
 Upendra Chivukula – Democratic politician who currently serves as a Commissioner on the New Jersey Board of Public Utilities after serving more than 12 years in the New Jersey General Assembly, where he had been the Deputy Speaker
 Dabeeru C. Rao – Director of the Division of Biostatistics at Washington University School of Medicine 
 Balamurali Ambati – American ophthalmologist, educator, and researcher. On May 19, 1995, he entered the Guinness Book of World Records as the world's youngest doctor
 Uma Pemmaraju – American anchor and host on the Fox News Channel cable network
 Vamsi Mootha – American physician-scientist and computational biologist of Indian descent
 G. S. Maddala – mathematician and economist best known for work in the field of Econometrics 
 J. N. Reddy – professor and holder of the Oscar S. Wyatt Endowed Chair in Mechanical Engineering at Texas A&M University
 Neeli Bendapudi – President of University of Louisville 
 Calyampudi Radhakrishna Rao – professor emeritus at Pennsylvania State University and research professor at the university at Buffalo
 Ravi V. Bellamkonda – Vinik Dean of Engineering Duke University Edmund T. Pratt Jr. School of Engineering
 Yellapragada Subbarao – Indian biochemist who discovered the function of adenosine triphosphate as an energy source in the cell
 Nina Davuluri – Miss America 2014
 Dattatreyudu Nori – Vice Chairman of the Radiation Oncologist Department at The New York-Presbyterian Hospital/Weill Cornell Medical College in New York City
 V. Mohan Reddy – pediatric cardiothoracic surgeon at Stanford
 E. Premkumar Reddy – oncologist; director of Fels institute of cancer research and molecular biology at Temple University 
 Aruna Miller – American politician and former members of the Maryland House of delegates representing District 15 in Montgomery County, Maryland 
 Laxmi Poruri – tennis player
 Raja Kumari – singer
 Mathukumalli Vidyasagar – control theorist
 Hari Kondabolu – stand-up comedian
 Ashok Kondabolu – DJ, rapper, former member of hip-hop group Das Racist 
 Sashi Reddy – entrepreneur, venture capitalist, and philanthropist
 Raj Reddy – computer scientist, founder of the Robotics Institute at Carnegie Mellon University, winner of Turing Award 
 Lakireddy Bali Reddy – convicted felon, charged for sex trafficking, visa fraud, and tax code violations
 Alluri Satyanarayana Raju – first General Secretary in AICC in Nehru Govt.
 Sekhar Puli – Indian-American entrepreneur, Investor and philanthropist
South Africa
 Anand Naidoo – South African journalist
 Jailoshini Naidoo – South African actress
 Leeanda Reddy – South African actor
French Yanam
Diwan Bouloussou Soubramaniam Sastroulou - (Ancien Membre du Conseil Local et Conseil Municipal de Yanaon, Ancien Jury De Yanaon, Former Diwan of Manyam Zamindari of French Yanam)
Bezawada Bapa Naidou - (Ancien Maire De Yanaon)
Kamichetty Venugopala Rao Naidou - (Ancien Maire De Yanaon)
 Kamichetty Sri Parasurama Varaprasada Rao Naidu - Former MLA of Yanam for six consecutive terms and Deputy Speaker, Speaker of Puducherry Legislative Assembly.
Dadala Raphael Ramanayya - Freedom fighter
Samatam Krishnayya - Poet and Pro-French Activist, Maire(interim) de Yanaon 
Malladi Krishna Rao - Puducherry Health Minister

Modern writers

Billionaires & CEOs 

 Satya Nadella – CEO, Microsoft
 Srini Raju – Founder TV9
 Mohan Reddy – Founder and Chairman Cyient
 PMS Prasad – CEO, Reliance Industries
 Grandhi Mallikarjuna Rao – GMR Group
 Gunapati Venkata Krishna Reddy – GVK Group 
 Shantanu Narayen – CEO, Adobe Systems
 Anji Reddy – Dr. Reddy's Laboratories
 Prathap C. Reddy – Founder, Apollo Hospitals
 Vikram Akula – Founder, SKS Microfinance
 Sashi Reddi – Founder Sri Capital
 Ramachandra Naidu Galla – Founder, Amara Raja Group
 Padmasree Warrior – CEO, Cisco Systems
 Lagadapati Madhusudan Rao – Lanco Infra Founder, MD
 Narayana Kocherlakota – President of Federal Reserve Bank of Minneapolis
 Prasad Nimmagadda – Matrix Labs Founder, MD
 Varaprasad Reddy – Shanta Biotech Founder, MD
 AVS Raju – Founder, Nagarjuna Construction Company
 Nama Nageswara Rao – Founder, Madhucon Projects
 Ramoji Rao – Eenadu Group
 Mekapati Rajamohan Reddy – KMC Infra Founder, MD
 Srini Kopollu – Microsoft India
 Magunta Sreenivasulu Reddy – chairman, Balaji Group
 T. Subbarami Reddy – Founder of Gayatri Group of Companies
 Byrraju Ramalinga Raju – Founder of Satyam Computers
 Ramesh Gelli – Founder of Global Trust Bank and the only Banker to win Padmashree
 P. V. Ramprasad Reddy – Founder Aurabindo pharma

Sports
Cricket
 C. K. Nayudu – First Captain of Indian Cricket Team
 Maharajkumar of Vizianagram alias Pusapati Vijay Ananda Gajapathi Raju, – Second Captain of Indian Cricket Team
 Buchi Babu Naidu – Father of South Indian Cricket
 Cotah Ramaswami – Represented India in both International Cricket and Tennis
 Hanuma Vihari – Indian test cricket team player 
 M.Baliah Naidu – Cricketer
 M. Suryanarayan – Indian Test Cricketer
 M. S. K. Prasad – Cricketer
 M. L. Jaisimha – Cricketer
 Shivlal Yadav – Cricketer
 Bharath Reddy – Test Cricketer (1978–1981)
 Venugopal Rao – Cricketer
 Ambati Rayudu – Cricketer
 Rohit Sharma – Cricketer
 Dinesh Karthik – Cricketer from Tamilnadu
 Lakshmipathy Balaji – Cricketer from Tamilnadu
 V. V. S. Laxman – Cricketer
 Venkatapathy Raju – Cricketer
 Bharat Arun – Cricketer
 Sandeep Goud – Cricketer
 M. V. Narasimha Rao – Cricketer
 M. Venkataramana – Cricketer
 Pochiah Krishnamurthy – Cricketer
 Sabbhineni Meghana – Women Cricketer
 Sravanthi Naidu – Women Cricketer
 Rajani Venugopal – Women Cricketer
 Sneha Deepthi – Women Cricketer
 Diana David – Women Cricketer
 Ravi Kalpana – Women Cricketer
 Purnima Rau – Women Cricketer
 Arundhati Reddy – Women Cricketer
Tennis
 Mahesh Bhupathi – First Indian to win a major tournament
 Saketh Myneni – He won a gold medal in Mixed doubles and a silver medal in Men's doubles event at Incheon Asian Games 2014
 Laxmi Poruri – the first Indian-American female to play professional tennis on the WTA Tour in the modern era
 Rushmi Chakravarthi – She won a record 52 ITF titles, the highest number set by an Indian female player
 Pranjala Yadlapalli – Pranjala has won four singles titles and six doubles titles on the ITF Women's Circuit
 Vishnu Vardhan – He won bronze medal in men's doubles at 2010 Asian games in Guangzhou, China. He paired-up with and Sania Mirza for mixed doubles and won silver medal at the same event
 Jafreen Shaik – She claimed a bronze medal in the mixed doubles at the 2017 Summer Deaflympics partnering with Prithvi Sekhar
 Sowjanya Bavisetti – Women Tennis player
 Rekha Boyalapalli – Women Tennis player
 Rishika Sunkara – Women Tennis player
 Vishal Punna – Tennis Player
 Bhanu Nunna – Tennis Player
Speedcubing
 Krishnam Raju Gadiraju – is an accomplished Indian speedcuber and unicyclist. He is a six-time world record holder and the first Indian to ever set a world record in speedcubing and unicycling.
Human Calculator
 Neelakantha Bhanu Prakash – is a human calculator from India, and is titled as the "World's Fastest Human Calculator". BBC said "Neelakantha Bhanu Prakash is to math (mental calculation) what Usain Bolt is to running".
Chess
 Koneru Humpy – Chess Grand Master, Arjuna Award winner
 Pendyala Harikrishna – Chess Grand Master, Arjuna Award winner
 Harika Dronavalli – Chess Grand Master, Arjuna Award winner
 Gukesh D – Chess Grand Master
 Vaishali Rameshbabu – Chess Grand Master
 Rameshbabu Praggnanandhaa – Chess Grand Master
 Bodda Pratyusha – Chess Grand Master
 Arjun Erigaisi – Chess Grand Master
 M. R. Lalith Babu – Chess Grand Master
  Harsha Bharathakoti – Chess Grand Master
  Raja Rithvik R. – Chess Grand Master
  Karthik Venkataraman – Chess Grand Master
 Sahiti P. Lakshmi – Chess Woman International Master
 Nutakki Priyanka – Chess Woman International Master
  Praharsh Sanjeev Koka – Chess Player
  Bala Chandra Prasad Dhulipalla – Chess Player
  Mehar Chinna Reddy C.H. – Chess International Master
  Vijaya Sai Krishna G. – Chess International Master
  P. D. S. Girinath – Chess International Master
  Rohit Gogineni – Chess International Master
  Sai Agni Jeevitesh – Chess International Master
  C R G Krishna – Chess International Master
  Sreeshwan Maralakshikari – Chess International Master
  Lanka Ravi – Chess International Master
  Teja S. Ravi – Chess International Master
  M. Chakravarthi Reddy – Chess International Master
  N. Krishna Teja – Chess International Master
  Sahajasri Cholleti – Chess Woman International Master
  Vinuthna N. – Chess Woman International Master
  Harshita Guddanti – Chess Woman International Master
  Sahithi Varshini M – Chess Player
  Koneru Ashok – Chess Player, Dronacharya Awardee
Football
 Tulsidas Balaram – represented the country in international competitions including the Olympic Games
 K. Appalaraju – He scored a goal in a 2-0 win over South Korea in 1964 Asian Cup. He also scored a hat-trick in a 5-3 win over Sri Lanka in 1964 Summer Olympics Football tournament qualification
 Soumya Guguloth – Women Football player
Other Countries
 Vikash Dhorasoo – French international footballer, played for France in 2006 World Cup
Others
 Neelapu Rami Reddy – Sprinter and athletics champion
 K. Krishna Mohan – the first Indian to break the 14 second barrier in 110 metre hurdles 
 Shamsher Khan – was an Indian swimmer who represented India in the 1956 Summer Olympics
 Anup Kumar Yama – Roller Skater
 Aruna Reddy – an Indian female artistic gymnast, representing at international competitions. She won bronze medal in 2018 World Cup Gymnastics in women's vault event in Melbourne. She created history by becoming the first Indian to clinch a medal at Gymnastics World Cup
 K. Srinivas – He was the Indian national carrom champion and the winner of the 4th Carrom World Cup held at the Maldives
 Ambati Prudhvi Reddy – Basketball player
 B. V. Satyanarayan – He competed in the men's long jump at the 1960 Summer Olympics and the 1964 Summer Olympics
Boxing
 Usha Nagisetty – She won the gold medal at the 2008 Asian Women Boxing Championships and the silver medal at the 2008 AIBA Women's World Boxing Championship.
 Mohammad Hussamuddin – Hussamuddin won a Bronze at the 2018 Commonwealth Games held at Gold Coast in Queensland, Australia
 Nikhat Zareen – She won gold medal at the 2022 IBA Women's World Boxing Championships.She has become the fifth Indian woman to win a gold medal at the IBA World Boxing Championships
 Bharadwaj Dayala – the first Indian to complete a solo tour around the world on an Indian-made Karizma motorcycle
 Sri Vyshnavi Yarlagadda – the first Indian to set a Junior World Record and also the first Indian woman to win a gold medal in World Junior Memory Championships.She is the youngest and the first woman in India to achieve the International Master of Memory title
Archery
 Jignas Chittibomma – He is noted as the youngest archer in India's team and being instrumental in winning team silver medal in Commonwealth Games of 2010 that was held at New Delhi in India 
 Pranitha Vardhineni – Pranitha Vardhineni represented India in the women's individual and team archery events at the 2008 Summer Olympics in Beijing
 Cherukuri Lenin – he won a silver medal at the Asian Grand Prix in Malaysia
 Jyothi Surekha Vennam – At the age of 13, she won an Olympic round gold medal at the Mexican Grand Prix. At the Mexican Grand Prix, she also won bronze (20m) and three silver (50m and 40m)
  Dhiraj Bommadevara
 Jayalakshmi Sarikonda – She competes in the compound women event. She won medals in international archery events
Volley Ball
 A. Ramana Rao – He was the head coach for the Indian men's volleyball team at the Asian Men's Volleyball Championship at Perth in 1991. He was also the first Indian volleyball coach to qualify as FIVB Instructor in the German Democratic Republic in 1986
 Shyam Sunder Rao – former Indian volleyball player and coach.He is a recipient of Arjuna award and, in 1995, the Dronacharya award
 Yejju Subba Rao – He was the President of Volleyball Federation of India honored Y Subba Rao with Five Gold coins for his extraordinary contribution towards Indian volleyball
 P. V. Ramana – He was a member of the India men's national volleyball team. In the 1986 Asian Games, he was part of the team that won a bronze medal
 Tilakam Gopal – is a former volleyball player from India. He captained the India national team at the 1966 Asian Games
Weight Lifting
 Karnam Malleswari – Olympic medalist in weight lifting
 Ragala Venkat Rahul – He won a gold medal in the men's 85 kg weight class at the 2018 Commonwealth Games in Gold Coast, Australia
 Valluri Srinivasa Rao – Weight lifter, winner of bronze medal in the 2010 Commonwealth Games in Delhi in the Men's 56 kg category
 Santoshi Matsa – She won the silver medal in the women's 53 kg weight class at the 2014 Commonwealth Games at Glasgow
 Shailaja Pujari – She won 3 Gold Medals in the women's 75 kg weight class at the 2002 Commonwealth Games Manchester
 Neelam Setti Laxmi – She won two silver medals at the 2002 Commonwealth Games
 Badathala Adisekhar – He competed in the 1992 and 1996 Summer Olympics
 Manikyalu Malla Venkata – He competed in the men's flyweight event at the 1984 Summer Olympics
 Kamineni Eswara Rao – He competed at the 1952 Summer Olympics and the 1956 Summer Olympics
 Dandamudi Rajagopal Rao – First Indian weightlifting champion continuously for 13 years from 1945 to 1958 popularly known as Indian Tarzan
Body Builders
 Kodi Rammurthy Naidu – Bodybuilder and wrestler
 Laxman Reddy – Body Building champion – Winner, Mr. World 2010
 Thota Narasaiah Naidu – Professional Wrestler and Freedom fighter
Table tennis
 Sharath Kamal – The first Indian table tennis player ever to become ten times Senior National Champion
 Sreeja Akula – Table Tennis
Field Hockey
 Mukesh Kumar – represented his native country at three consecutive Summer Olympics. Triple Olympian and winner of Arjuna award-1995, Padmashri Award-2003
 Rajani Etimarpu – The first Women from Andhra pradesh to be part of the Indian women's hockey team and 2016 Rio Olympics
  Yendala Soundarya – The first Women from Telangana to be part of the Indian women's hockey team and 2016 Rio Olympics
 Alloysius Edwards – Olympian Moscow Olympics 1996
Badminton
 P. V. Sindhu – India's First Female Multi-medallist in Olympics with Silver and Bronze.
 Chetan Anand – Badminton champion
 Pullela Gopichand – 2002 All England Shuttle Badminton champion
 P. V. V. Lakshmi – Badminton player
 Gayathri Gopichand – Badminton Player
 Jwala Gutta – Badminton champion
 Parupalli Kashyap – Badminton Player 
 Gurusai Dutt – Badminton Player 
 Satwiksairaj Rankireddy – Badminton Player 
 S. M. Arif – Former player and coach,He is a recipient of Dronacharya Award and Padma Shri Award 
 Gadde Ruthvika Shivani – Badminton Player
 N. Sikki Reddy – Badminton Player
 Srikanth Kidambi – Badminton player
 B. Sai Praneeth – Badminton player
 B. Sumeeth Reddy – Badminton player
 Harika Veludurthi – Badminton player
 Nandagopal Kidambi – Badminton player
 K. Maneesha – Badminton player
 Srivedya Gurazada – Badminton player
 Meghana Jakkampudi – Badminton player
 Deepthi Chapala – Badminton player
 K. Neelima Chowdary – Badminton player
 Tarun Kona – Badminton player
 Shikha Gautam – Badminton player
 Siril Verma – Badminton player
 Sudheer Babu – Badminton player
Racing
 Narain Karthikeyan – India's first Formula 1 driver
 S. Karivardhan – car constructor and National Champion
 Anindith Reddy – National Champion Driver in the 2016 Euro JK 16,JK 17 Championship
  Sailesh Bolisetty
  Tarun Reddy
Mountain climbing
 Malavath Purna – Youngest female to climb Mount Everest
 Malli Mastan Babu – World record of climbing the Seven Summits in the shortest span of time at that point

Films
Actors
 Nagarjuna – Film actor/producer/studio owner
 Dr. Akkineni Nageswara Rao – Film actor and Studio owner
 Adivi Sesh – Actor
 Ali – Film Actor
 Allu Rama Lingaiah – Actor/Comedian
 Allari Naresh – Film Actor
 Allu Arjun – Film Actor/dancer
 Aryan Rajesh – Film Actor
 Padmanabham – Film Actor, Producer
 Babu Mohan – Standup comedian
 Brahmanandam – Actor, Guinness record holder for acting more than 700 films
 Chalam – Actor and Producer
 Chiranjeevi – Telugu actor, producer, politician, businessman. Praja Rajyam party President.
 V. Nagayya – Actor
 Venkatesh – Telugu film actor
 Dasari Narayana Rao – Telugu director, actor and producer
 Eelapata Raghuramaiah – Telugu Film and Stage Actor, Padmasri Award Winner, Kendra Sangeeta Nataka Akademy Award Winner 
 Gummadi – Telugu film actor
 Hari Kondabolu – Standup comedian
 Jagapati Babu – Film Actor
 Jayam Ravi – Tamil film actor; (Telugu mother)
 J. D. Chakravarthy – Film Actor
 Jaya Prakash Reddy – Actor
 Johny Lever – Film Actor/Stand-up Comedian
 Kaikala Satyanarayana – Actor and producer
 Kanta Rao – Film Actor
 Krishnam Raju – Film Actor
 Krishna – Film Actor/Studio owner
 Kota Srinivasa Rao – Film Actor
 Mahesh Babu – Film Actor, Philanthropist
 Meka Srikanth – Film Actor
 M. Prabhakar Reddy – Actor
 Manchu Manoj – Film Actor
 Maganti Murali Mohan – Film Actor/Producer
 M.S. Narayana – Film Actor
 Nani – Actor
 Napoleon – Film Actor
 Nandamuri Balakrishna – Film Actor
 Nandamuri Harikrishna – Film Actor
 Nagendra Babu – Actor/producer
 Nani (actor) – Film actor
 Naveen Polishetty – Telugu and Hindi actor
 Naveen Chandra – Telugu and Tamil actor
 Nitin Kumar Reddy – Film Actor
 N.T. Rama Rao – Film Actor, Former Chief Minister of Andhra Pradesh
 N. T. Rama Rao Jr. – Actor/Singer (Telugu Father)
 Nandamuri Kalyan Ram – Film Actor/Producer
 Pawan Kalyan – Telugu actor, Jana Sena Party President
 Prabhas – Film Actor
 Raghupathi Venkaiah Naidu – Father of Telugu cinema
 Rami Reddy – Actor
 Rallapalli
 Relangi – Film Actor and Singer
 Ramana Reddy – Comedian
 Rajanala – Actor
 Rajiv Kanakala – Actor
 Ram – Film actor
 Ravi Krishna – Actor
 Rao Gopal Rao – Film Actor
 Ram Charan Teja – Actor
 Rajendra Prasad – Film Actor
 Raviteja – Film Actor
 Sunil – Film Actor
 Srihari – Actor/producer
 Sobhan Babu – Film Actor
 Suthi Veerabhadra Rao – Actor
 Suthi Velu – Actor
 Tanikella Bharani – Dialogue Writer/Actor
 Tarun – Film Actor
 Uday Kiran – Film Actor
 Vaibhav Reddy – Actor
 Vijay Deverakonda – Actor
 Vishnu Vardhan Babu – Film Actor
 Vishal – Tamil Film Actor
Actresses
 Aditi Rao Hydari – Telugu, Hindi and Tamil actress (Telugu mother)
 Aishwarya Rajesh – Tamil and Telugu actress
 Anandhi – works in Telugu and Tamil films
 Annapoorna – Telugu actress
 Anjali – Telugu & Tamil film actress
 Bhanupriya – Actress
 Bindu Madhavi Reddy – actress
 Bhanumathi Ramakrishna – Telugu, Tamil actress/producer
 Devika – Telugu and Tamil actress
 Eesha Rebba – Telugu actress
 Fatafat Jayalaxmi – Telugu actress in Telugu, Tamil, Malayalam, and Kannada films
 Gautami – Famous actress of the 1980s and 1990s who worked in Tamil, Telugu and Malayalam films
 G. Varalakshmi – actress
 Jayasudha – Film actress
 Jaya Prada – Film actress
 Jamuna – Telugu actress
 Kanchana – 1950s, 1960s and 1970s actress who acted in Tamil, Telugu and Kannada films
 Kiran Rao – Indian film producer and wife of Bollywood actor Amir Khan
 Krishnaveni – Actress, singer, producer
 Krishna Kumari – Telugu actress
 Keerthi Reddy – Actress
 Lakshmi – Telugu and Tamil actress (Telugu father)
 Lakshmi Manchu – Telugu actress
 Laya – Film Actress
 Malashri – Kannada actress
 P. Kannamba – Telugu, Tamil actress/producer
 Priya Anand – Tamil and Hindi actress (Telugu mother)
 Rambha – Actress
 Ramya Krishnan – Actress. (Telugu father)
Rashmika Mandanna – Actress. (Telugu, Tamil, Kannada)
 Rohini (actress) – Actress
 Roja Selvamani – Actress
 Rekha – Mother is Telugu actress Pushpavalli
 Sarayu Rao – American actress
 Samantha – Telugu and Tamil actress 
 Sameera Reddy – Actress (Telugu father)
 Santha Kumari – Telugu, Tamil actress/producer
 Savitri – Telugu, Tamil actress/producer
 Sarada – Film actress
 Silk Smitha – actress in South Indian film industry
 Sneha – Actress
 Sowkar Janaki – Telugu, Tamil actress
 Sobhita Dhulipala – Telugu, Hindi actress
 Sridevi – Indian actress (Telugu family from Tamilnadu)
 Sri Divya – Telugu film actress
 S. Varalakshmi – Telugu, Tamil actress
 Shreya Dhanwanthary – Hindi, Telugu actress
 Swara Bhaskar – Film actress. (Telugu father)
 Swati Reddy – Film actress/television presenter
 Tina Desai – Telugu mother and Gujarati father
 Vijayashanti – Actress and politician
 Vanisri – Telugu and Kannada actress
Producers, Writer and Directors
 E. V. V. Satyanarayana – Film Director
 G. Neelakanta Reddy – Film Director
 S. Gopal Reddy – Cinematographer, Producer
 Ananth Sreeram – Lyricist
 Moola Narayana Swamy – Producer
 P. Pullayya – Producer
 Shyam Prasad Reddy – Film Producer
 D.V. Narasa Raju – Writer and Film Director
 Nandamuri Taraka Rama Rao – Film Actor/Director
 Vidyasagar – Music director
 Gopichand Lagadapati – Actor/Director/Writer/Producer
 Malladi Venkata Krishna Murthy – Writer
 H. M. Reddy – First Telugu, first Tamil & first Kannada film director
 B. N. Reddy – Legendary director & producer, Dadasaheb phalke winner
 Ramesh Naidu – Music director
 B. Nagireddy – Legendary director & producer, Dadasaheb phalke winner
 Moola Narayana Swamy – Vauhini Studios owner and producer
 Nandini Reddy – Film Director
 Sameer Reddy – Cinematographer
 Midde Rama Rao – Film Producer
 Katta Subba Rao – Telugu Film Director
 K. Viswanath – One of India's most famous directors
 Akkineni L. V. Prasad – Producer/Director
 Edida Nageswara Rao – Producer
 Allu Aravind – Producer
 A.M. Rathnam – Producer
 Sekhar Kammula – Director/producer
 Nagesh Kukunoor – Director/producer
 V. V. Vinayak – Director
 Krishna Vamsi – Director
 Sukumar – Director
 Bapu – Artist/Film Director
 Adurthi Subba Rao – Film Producer/Director
 D. Ramanaidu – Film Producer/Studio owner
 A. Kodandarami Reddy – Film Director
 Kovelamudi Raghavendra Rao – Director/Producer
 Kodi Ramakrishna – Director
 Paruchuri Brothers – Writers
 S. V. Krishna Reddy – Film Director
 Jandhyala – Film Director
 Yandamuri Veerendranath – Writer/Director
 Vamsy – Film Director
 Pingali Nagendrarao – Poet and Lyricist
 Chota K. Naidu – Cinematographer
 Shyam K. Naidu – Cinematographer
 Devi Sri Prasad – Music Director
 Surender Reddy – Film Director
 S. S. Rajamouli – Film Director
 Prashanth Neel – Kannada and Telugu film director from Karnataka
 Samudrala Sr. – Poet and Lyricist
 Samudrala Jr. – Poet and Lyricist
 Selvaraghavan – Tamil Film Director
 Acharya Aatreya – Poet and Lyricist
 Aarudhra – Poet and Lyricist
 Kosaraju Raghavaiah – Poet and Lyricist
 Daasarathi Krishnamacharyulu – Poet and Lyricist
 Veturi – Poet and Lyricist
 Jaladi – Poet and Lyricist
 Rajasri – Poet and Lyricist
 Vennelakanti – Poet and Lyricist
 Sirivennela Sitaramasastri – Poet and Lyricist
 Bhuvana Chandra – Poet and Lyricist
 C. Aswani Dutt – Film Producer
 Dil Raju – Film Producer
 K.S. Rama Rao – Film Producer
 Ram Gopal Varma – Film Producer/Director
 M.M. Keeravani – Music Director
 Aneesh Chaganty – Hollywood Film director
 Mani Sharma – Music Director
 M. S. Raju – Film Producer
 A. Sreekar Prasad – Film Editor
 Puri Jagannadh – Film Director
 Trivikram Srinivas – Dialogue Writer/Film Director
Singers
 Ghantasala – Legendary Singer and music Composer.
 S.P. Balasubrahmanyam – Singer, Guinness record holder having sung more number of songs by any male
 S. Janaki – a legendary South Indian playback singer
 P. Susheela – a legendary South Indian playback singer
 S.P. Sailaja – Singer
 Mano – Singer
 Madhavapeddi Satyam – Singer

Artists
 Pakhal Tirumal Reddy – Artist
 Siddharth Katragadda – Artist Writer Filmmaker Poet
 Krishna Reddy – Printmaker and sculptor
 Laxma Goud
 Damerla Rama Rao
 Vempati Chinna Satyam – Exponent of Kuchipudi dance
 Raja and Radha Reddy – Kuchipudi dancers
 Shobha Naidu – Kuchipudi dancer
 Yamini Reddy – Kuchipudi dancer
 Eelapata Raghuramaiah – Stage and Cine Actor of Andhra Pradesh

Musicians and Composers

 Tyagaraja
 Shyama Shastri
 Tallapaka Annamacharya
 Bhadrachala Ramadasu
 Kshetrayya
 Aadibhotla Narayana Das
 Ghantasala Venkateswara Rao
 M. Balamuralikrishna
 P. Suseela
 S. Janaki
 S. P. Balasubrahmanyam
 P. B. Sreenivas
 Nagoor Babu
 Dwaram Venkataswamy Naidu
 Rakesh Yankaran – Indo-Trinidadian singer from Trinidad and Tobago
 U. Srinivas – He is popularly known as Mandolin Srinivas.
 U. Rajesh – He is popularly known as Mandolin Rajesh.

Journalists 
 Kasinadhuni Nageswara Rao – journalist of early twentieth century and father of the library movement in Andhra, Founder of Andhra patrika
 N. Subba Rao Pantulu and D.Kesava Rao pantulu (Co Founders of The Hindu)
 Patanjali – ex-chief editor, Sakshi
 G. K. Reddy – Journalist
 Suravaram Pratapareddy – Founder of Golconda Patrika, a journal in Hyderabad State
 Palagummi Sainath – Rural India Affairs Reporter, The Hindu
 Puripanda Appala Swamy.

See also
 List of Telugu poets

References

Telugu people
T